Pharmacognosy Reviews is a peer-reviewed open-access medical journal published by  Pharmacognosy Network Worldwide (Phcog.net). The journal publishes articles on the subject of pharmacognosy, natural products, and phytochemistry. It is indexed with Caspur, EBSCO, ProQuest, and Scopus.

Phcog.net appeared on Beall's list of predatory open-access journals from October 2012 through September 12, 2015.

References

External links 
 
 Phcog.net

Open access journals
Biannual journals
English-language journals
Pharmacology journals
Publications established in 2007
Medknow Publications academic journals